Scedella glebosa is a species of tephritid or fruit flies in the genus Scedella of the family Tephritidae.

Distribution
Kenya, Tanzania.

References

Tephritinae
Insects described in 1957
Diptera of Africa